David Zarifa is a Canadian academic, currently a Canada Research Chair in Life Course Transitions in Northern and Rural Communities at Nipissing University. Zarifa is a Professor of Sociology in the Faculty of Arts & Science at Nipissing University in North Bay, Ontario. His areas of specialization include sociology of education, social inequality, sociology of work, and quantitative research methods.

Biography
Zarifa David Zarif is a Canadian sociologist and an Associate Professor at Nipissing University in North Bay, Ontario. He was born and raised in Toronto, where he completed his undergraduate studies at York University. Zarif then moved to the United Kingdom to pursue his graduate studies, obtaining a Master's degree in Sociology from the University of Warwick and a Ph.D. in Sociology from the University of Manchester.

Zarif's academic work focuses on issues related to education and social inequality. He has published extensively on topics such as the impact of neoliberalism on education policy, the experiences of racialized and marginalized students in schools, and the transition of young people from school to work. Zarif's research has been recognized with numerous awards and honors, including a prestigious Tier II Canada Research Chair in Education and Work awarded in 2018.

In addition to his academic work, Zarif is also actively involved in community-based research and outreach initiatives. He has worked with a range of community organizations and advocacy groups on issues related to education, social justice, and youth empowerment. He also serves as a consultant and expert witness on matters related to education policy and equity.

References

Year of birth missing (living people)
Living people
Academic staff of Nipissing University
University of Western Ontario alumni
McMaster University alumni
Canada Research Chairs
Canadian sociologists